Jeff Betts (born March 8, 1970 in Charles City, Iowa) is an American former soccer forward and coach who spent most of his career playing indoor soccer.  He was a three time All Star and the 2000 World Indoor Soccer League Coach of the Year.

College
Betts began his collegiate soccer career at San Diego State University in 1988.  
In 1989, he led the team in scoring with 32 points on 10 goals and 12 assists.  The 12 assists remains a San Diego single season record.  He appears to have taken a year off from school before finishing his collegiate career with two seasons at the University of Portland in 1991 and 1992. He graduated in 1993.

Professional
In 1993, he signed with the Fort Lauderdale Strikers in the American Professional Soccer League.  He played three games  before the Strikers waived him on June 18, 1993.  He then signed with the Portland Pride of the Continental Indoor Soccer League (CISL).  The CISL was a summer indoor league.  That fall, he signed with the Milwaukee Wave of the National Professional Soccer League (NPSL) which played a winter indoor schedule.  In 1994, he returned to the Pride and continued to play each summer with the team until the CISL collapsed following the 1997 season.  His 139 goals put him sixth on the CISL's all time goals list and his 127 assists are fifth all time.  In 1995, he scored 35 goals in 27 games, gaining him a place on the CISL All Star team.  He was the All Star Game Offensive MVP.  On February 7, 1996, the San Jose Clash selected Betts in the 7th round (68th overall) in the 1996 MLS Inaugural Player Draft.  He did not sign with the Clash.  Following the collapse of the CISL in 1997, several teams formed the Premier Soccer Alliance.  With the new league, the Pride ownership chose to rename the team the Portland Pythons.  This season, Betts scored 19 goals in 12 games and a spot on the All Star team.  In 1998, Betts returned to the NPSL, this time with the Florida ThunderCats.  In 1999, the PSA was renamed the World Indoor Soccer League.  At some point, Betts may have also played for the Arizona Thunder.  In 2000, he served as coach for the Utah Freezz as well as playing for the team.  He was the 2000 WISL Coach of the Year.  By the time the WISL ceased operations in 2001, Betts ranked third all time in WISL goals with 53 and sixth all time in assists with 39.  The Freezz folded in 2001.  On November 14, 2002, the Dallas Sidekicks of the Major Indoor Soccer League signed Betts.  He played fourteen games, then left the team on February 6, 2003.

References

External links
  Indoor Records
 Dallas Sidekicks player profile

1970 births
Living people
American Professional Soccer League players
American soccer coaches
American soccer players
Arizona Thunder players
Continental Indoor Soccer League players
Dallas Sidekicks (2001–2008 MISL) players
Florida ThunderCats players
Fort Lauderdale Strikers (1988–1994) players
Milwaukee Wave players
Portland Pilots men's soccer players
National Professional Soccer League (1984–2001) players
Portland Pythons players
Portland Pride players
Premier Soccer Alliance players
San Diego State Aztecs men's soccer players
Soccer players from Iowa
World Indoor Soccer League coaches
World Indoor Soccer League players
Utah Freezz players
People from Charles City, Iowa
Association football forwards
Player-coaches